Anton Ciprian Tătărușanu (born 9 February 1986) is a Romanian professional footballer who plays as a goalkeeper for  club AC Milan.

He started his senior career in Romania with Juventus București, going on to represent Gloria Bistrița and FC Steaua București in the country. Tătărușanu made over 180 appearances in all competitions for the latter, and in the summer of 2014 joined Fiorentina on a free transfer. After three seasons with the Viola, he moved to France with spells at Nantes and Lyon. In September 2020, Tătărușanu transferred back to Italy and signed for AC Milan.

Tătărușanu earned 73 caps for the Romania senior team, with which he made his debut in 2010. He was a member of the squad that participated at the UEFA Euro 2016, starting in all three group stage matches of the competition. Four years later, Tătărușanu announced his retirement from the national team at age 34.

Club career

Early career
Born in Bucharest, Tătărușanu began his football career with local Juventus București. He later joined Gloria Bistrița, making his first division debut in a 1–0 away victory over Unirea Urziceni on 23 May 2007.

Steaua București

In May 2008, it was announced that 22-year-old Tătărușanu was transferred to FC Steaua București for a fee of €1.5 million. He spent the following season on loan at Gloria Bistrița, as the Roș-albaștrii already had a first-choice goalkeeper in the person of Róbinson Zapata.

Tătărușanu made his European debut on 16 July 2009, in a 2–0 victory against Hungarian side Újpest in the UEFA Europa League. On 2 August, he played his first Liga I game for Steaua in a 2–0 win over Ceahlăul Piatra Neamț. On 19 August 2010, he helped his team progress further to the Europa League group stage after making two saves at the penalty shootout against Grasshopper.

In June 2011, it was reported that Napoli submitted a €3 million bid for the transfer of Tătărușanu, but the offer was rejected. During his spell in the capital, he amassed competitive totals of 187 games and won four domestic trophies.

Fiorentina
Tătărușanu refused to renew his contract with Steaua București and left the club on Bosman ruling, subsequently signing a five-year deal with Italian team Fiorentina on 9 June 2014. He made his debut for the Viola on 18 September, in a 3–0 Europa League group stage victory over Guingamp.

He totalled seven appearances in the competition, including a 1–1 round of 32 draw at Tottenham Hotspur. On 6 January 2015, he played his first Serie A match, a 0–1 loss to Parma. Tătărușanu was then chosen in the starting eleven for eight consecutive games, until a 1–1 draw with Torino. He made his last appearance of the 2014–15 season in the final league fixture, a 3–0 win over Chievo.

Following the departure of Neto to Juventus in July 2015, Tătărușanu became the undisputed first-choice goalkeeper for Fiorentina, with his good display earning him the Gazeta Sporturilors 2015 Romanian Footballer of the Year award.

Nantes
In late July 2017, Tătărușanu was transferred by French club Nantes for an undisclosed fee. He made his competitive debut on 12 August in a 0–1 defeat to Marseille, being named man of the match for his performance. On 20 December 2017, he finished second behind Constantin Budescu in the 2017 Romanian Footballer of the Year award.

Tătărușanu amassed 37 appearances in his first campaign with "the Canaries", all in the Ligue 1, and managed to keep twelve clean sheets. In early April 2019, he saved two penalty kicks in successive matches; the first in a 0–3 Coupe de France loss to Paris Saint-Germain, and the second in a 0–1 league loss to Toulouse.

Lyon
On 13 June 2019, Tătărușanu chose to stay in France and joined Olympique Lyonnais as a free agent. He recorded his debut on 18 December that year, in a Coupe de la Ligue 4–1 win against Toulouse. He only played six matches overall during his one-year spell at Lyon, as he was considered a backup option to regular starter Anthony Lopes.

AC Milan
On 12 September 2020, AC Milan announced Tătărușanu as their new player after he agreed to a three-year deal with the club. One day earlier, Lyon had revealed the transfer fee for the 34-year-old to be €500,000.

In the position of second-choice goalkeeper behind Gianluigi Donnarumma, he made his debut on 26 October in a 3–3 league draw with Roma, after the former tested positive for COVID-19. Tătărușanu played in a Derby della Madonnina in the Coppa Italia in January 2021, being praised for his performance in the media despite his team being defeated 2–1 by Inter Milan.

The next season, Milan continued with Tătărușanu as their backup goalkeeper, this time behind Mike Maignan, Milan's acquisition after the departure of Donnarumma to Paris Saint-Germain in the summer. On 13 October 2021, Maignan was operated on his left wrist and ruled out for two and a half months. With Tătărușanu in goal, Milan went on a four-game winning streak in the Serie A against Hellas Verona, Bologna, Torino and Roma. On 7 November, Tătărușanu was Milan's goalkeeper in the Milan Derby, where he made a penalty save against Lautaro Martínez in an eventual 1–1 draw.

International career

In August 2009, Tătărușanu was selected by manager Răzvan Lucescu in Romania's squad for a match with Hungary. His full international debut came on 17 November 2010, in a 1–1 draw against Italy. Tătărușanu became a bronze medalist at  the Cyprus International Football Tournament in 2011.

He was picked for the preliminary 28-man UEFA Euro 2016 squad and eventually made it to the final list. He played in all three matches of the eventual group-stage exit, including the opener against hosts France.

On 19 November 2020, the day after earning his 73rd cap for the country in a 1–1 UEFA Nations League draw with Northern Ireland, Tătarușanu publicly announced his retirement from the national team.

Career statistics
Club

International

HonoursSteaua BucureștiLiga I: 2012–13, 2013–14
Cupa României: 2010–11
Supercupa României: 2013LyonCoupe de la Ligue runner-up: 2019–20AC MilanSerie A: 2021–22Individual'''Gazeta Sporturilor'' Romanian Footballer of the Year: 2015; runner-up: 2017

References

External links

1986 births
Living people
Footballers from Bucharest
Romanian footballers
Association football goalkeepers
Liga I players
Liga II players
ASC Daco-Getica București players
ACF Gloria Bistrița players
FC Steaua București players
Serie A players
ACF Fiorentina players
A.C. Milan players
Ligue 1 players
FC Nantes players
Olympique Lyonnais players
Romania under-21 international footballers
Romania international footballers
UEFA Euro 2016 players
Romanian expatriate footballers
Expatriate footballers in Italy
Expatriate footballers in France
Romanian expatriate sportspeople in Italy
Romanian expatriate sportspeople in France